Guillaume Guillemot (d. August 19, 1652) was governor of Trois-Rivières from 1651 to 1652. He was also known as Du Plessis-Kerbodot and was sometimes confused with Du Plessis-Bochart, head clerk of the Compagnie des Cent-Associés.

Guillemot was seigneur of the Kerbodot fief in Brittany. In 1657, he married Étiennette Després; they had two children. He arrived in Quebec City on October 13, 1651. Aiming to establish peace with the Iroquois, he led an emergency squad or "flying column" out from Trois-Rivières to seek them out. This unit was ambushed and twenty-two of the French, including Guillemot, were killed or captured by the Iroquois.

References 

Year of birth missing
1652 deaths
People of New France